The 1935–36 season was the 41st season of competitive football by Southampton, the club's 14th in the Second Division of the Football League, and the 50th season overall since the club's formation. Despite a strong start, the season was another lacklustre performance by the side, as they finished 17th in the league table just five points above the first relegation spot. After signing West Ham United centre-forward Vic Watson in the summer of 1935, the team won four of their first six games and briefly occupied the top spot in the league; however, a poor run of form running from October to December saw them drop back to the bottom half of the table, where they stayed for the rest of the campaign. Southampton finished the season with 14 wins, nine draws and 19 losses, equal on points with the clubs in 15th, 16th and 18th places.

In the 1935–36 FA Cup, Southampton entered the third round with an away fixture against First Division side Middlesbrough, against whom they lost 0–1 to exit the tournament at the first hurdle as they had done in so many recent seasons. Aside from the league and the FA Cup, the club played in two local tournaments, the Hampshire Combination Cup and the Hampshire Benevolent Cup. In the former, the Saints were knocked out of the semi-finals by Third Division South side Aldershot, who beat the second-flight side 4–0. In the latter, the club hosted top-flight local rivals Portsmouth but lost 1–2, extending their winless run in the tournament to seven years. Southampton's only friendly game of the campaign saw them hosting First Division side Wolverhampton Wanderers in January, with the higher division side beating the Saints 3–2.

Southampton used 20 different players during the 1935–36 season and had ten different goalscorers. Their top scorer was new centre-forward Vic Watson, who scored 14 goals in the Second Division campaign. Inside-forward Arthur Holt followed Watson with 13 goals in the league, ahead of 1934–35 top scorer Laurie Fishlock on seven goals. The club signed only two new players in time for the start of the season, while six players left the club during the year. The average attendance at The Dell during 1935–36 was 10,600. The highest attendance of the season was 21,333 in the club's official jubilee match against Tottenham Hotspur on 23 November 1935. The lowest attendance of the season was a record-low 1,875 against Port Vale on 30 March 1936, two days after the club's new heaviest league defeat, 0–8 against Tottenham.

Background and transfers
Ahead of the 1935–36 season starting, Southampton signed only two new players. In June 1935, they signed Vic Watson from West Ham United, who had missed out on promotion the previous season on goal average only, as their new first-choice centre-forward. He took the place of last season's primary centre-forward Norman Cole, who had moved to Norwich City. The club's second signing, in July, was half-back/forward Jack Gurry from recently relegated Leicester City. Also leaving Southampton in the summer were wing-half Frank Campbell, who had suffered a knee injury that developed into chronic arthritis which prevented him from continuing to play professionally (he subsequently joined Isle of Wight club Newport); wing-half Frank Ward, who left on a free transfer to Southern League side Folkestone; and out-of-favour inside-forward Alf Wheeler, who remained in the Second Division with Barnsley. In October, the club also sold forward James Horton to Aldershot, after just one season in which he only made a handful of appearances.

Towards the end of the season, Southampton surprisingly sold thir first-choice goalkeeper Billy Light – who had played in every single match of the season so far – to West Bromwich Albion, who were struggling in the First Division. To bring Light to the club, West Brom paid Southampton a transfer fee of £2,000 – a new English record fee for a goalkeeper. The decision to sell Light was unpopular amongst Saints fans, who had seen several high-profile players sold in recent seasons – club historians have reflected that the sale "naturally displeased fans", and claimed that it led to a "storm of protest".

Players transferred in

Players transferred out

Second Division

Southampton's strong run at the end of the 1934–35 season continued at the beginning of 1935–36, as they went unbeaten for the first six fixtures and picked up four wins to start off at the top of the league table. Early victories included a hard-fought 4–3 against Swansea Town on the opening day (in which Vic Watson scored on his Saints debut), a 1–0 double over recently-promoted Doncaster Rovers, and a 3–0 defeat of Bradford Park Avenue. The run of form was short-lived, however, and the Saints dropped into the mid-table region with just one win from their next eight games, five of which were defeats. Most of the losses were against fellow mid-table sides (namely, Sheffield United, Nottingham Forest, Fulham and Burnley), but ended with a surprising 2–5 loss at home to Charlton Athletic, who had just been promoted after winning the Third Division South. On 23 November, 50 years and two days after the club's very first match, Southampton picked up a 2–0 win over Tottenham Hotspur to mark their jubilee.

The win against Tottenham was the last for Southampton in 1935, however, as they went on a winless run extending into the new year which saw them drop from 8th to 14th in the Second Division standings. The eight-match run between 30 November and 1 January saw the Saints fall victim to a goal drought, as they scored just three times across the fixtures which included five 0–0 draws, a 2–4 defeat at Newcastle United, and home losses against Barnsley and West Ham United. A 1–0 win over promotion hopefuls Leicester City on 4 January kept the side in the fight for a top-half finish, however this was followed by four straight defeats which saw them dropping all the way to 17th in the table. Despite this poor run, the Saints picked up their biggest win of the season when they beat Nottingham Forest 7–2 at The Dell, with Watson scoring a hat-trick. The team's form continued to be inconsistent, as they hovered around the bottom third of the table, with a few narrow wins keeping them out of the relegation zone.

On 28 March 1936, Southampton suffered their heaviest league defeat to date when they lost 0–8 against Tottenham Hotspur at White Hart Lane. Joe Meek and George Hunt scored hat-tricks for Spurs, with the other two goals registered by Willie Evans. This would remain the club's biggest league defeat – equalled at the hands of Everton in the 1971–72 season – until they lost 0–9 to Leicester City in the Premier League in 2019. The next home game, a 0–1 loss against Port Vale two days later, saw the attendance at The Dell drop to a record-low 1,875 people. Despite this thrashing, the club responded in the final run-in with three wins from their last six fixtures, beating top-third sides Plymouth Argyle, Fulham and Blackpool to ensure their safety in the division. Ultimately, the Saints finished the season 17th in the Second Division table with just three more points than the previous season, and only seven points above the first relegation place. Manager George Kay left after the season ended to join Liverpool.

List of match results

Final league table

Results by matchday

FA Cup

Southampton entered the 1935–36 FA Cup in the third round, travelling north to face First Division mid-table side Middlesbrough. In front of a crowd just shy of 30,000 at Ayresome Park, the Saints succumbed to a 0–1 defeat, with the only goal scored by winger Arthur Cunliffe while the visitors were "reorganising" following an injury to Johnny McIlwaine.

Other matches
Outside of the league and the FA Cup, Southampton played three additional first-team matches during the 1935–36 season. The first was the semi-final of the annual Hampshire Combination Cup, for which they travelled to face nearby Third Division South club Aldershot, who thrashed the Second Division side 4–0. During a break in between league games in January, the club hosted a friendly match against top-flight Wolverhampton Wanderers, which they lost 2–3 despite goals from Laurie Fishlock and Vic Watson. Two days after the last game of the season, The Dell played host to the Hampshire Benevolent Cup charity match between the Saints and local rivals Portsmouth, having recently returned to its original single-branded format following three seasons combined with the Rowland Hospital Cup.

Player details

Southampton used 20 different players during the 1935–36 season, ten of whom scored during the campaign. The team played in a 2–3–5 formation throughout, using two full-backs, three half-backs, two outside forwards, two inside forwards and a centre-forward. Right-back Charlie Sillett featured in more games than any other player, being ever present with 43 appearances, followed by left-winger Laurie Fishlock who appeared in all but one league game. New centre-forward Vic Watson finished as the season's top scorer with 14 goals in the league, followed shortly by inside-forward Arthur Holt on 13 goals, then Fishlock (top scorer the previous season) on seven.

Squad statistics

Most appearances

Top goalscorers

Footnotes

References

Bibliography

External links
Southampton F.C. official website

Southampton F.C. seasons
Southampton